Alessandro Sartori is an Italian fashion designer, and the artistic director of Italian brand Zegna. Previously, he was creative director of Z Zegna and artistic director of Berluti.

Early life
Sartori received a degree in textile engineering in Biella, Italy, followed by a degree in fashion design in Milan in 1989.

Career

Zegna, 1989–2011
In 1989, Sartori began his career at Zegna and worked as a men’s wear designer for many years.

In 2003, Sartori became creative director of the newly created "Z Zegna" at Ermenegildo Zegna. He presented the Z Zegna first runway show in New York City in February 2007. Z Zegna successfully appeared at five New York Fashion Weeks, and then moved to Milan starting in June 2009.

Berluti, 2011–2016
On 1 July 2011 Sartori was appointed as artistic director at Berluti with the aim of creating a luxury total wardrobe.

On January 20, 2012 Sartori unveiled his first collection at the Ecole des Beaux-Arts, with footwear occupying rows of chairs lined up as if for a fashion show. Women's Wear Daily stated "It was an impressive debut." "Sartori’s collection was worn by a multigenerational cast of models in vignettes that telegraphed the Berluti lifestyle: playing chess in the library of a country chateau; having cocktails in a groovy apartment; gathering with friends under a full moon for a midnight shoe-polishing party, with Dom Pérignon as the shining agent (something serious Berluti devotees actually do)."

Sartori's last collection for Berluti, presented during Paris Menswear Fashion Week, on January 22, 2016 was viewed as his best collection  for the brand; Luke Leitch, on Vogue.com wrote: "This collection contained almost as many potential angles to elucidate excellence in menswear as there were grains of volcanic sand on the runway".

On February 1, 2016 Women's Wear Daily confirmed the rumors about Sartori leaving Berluti.

Zegna, 2016–present
On February 5, 2016 Ermenegildo Zegna Group announced that Sartori was appointed artistic director with responsibility across all Zegna brands and all creative functions. 

 Sartori officially joined the Ermenegildo Zegna Group in June 2016. His first fashion show was the Ermenegildo Zegna Couture Autumn/Winter 2017 collection at HangarBicocca. In 2019 Sartori chose wide, urban spaces in Milan – such as Stazione Centrale and former production plant Area Falck – as stages to his collections.

In January 2019 for the first time, during the Ermenegildo Zegna XXX Winter 2019 fashion show, Sartori unveiled the #USETHEEXISTING project, which is entirely made with innovative processes from pre-existing sources.

Under his direction, in 2017 Zegna opened its first Bespoke Atelier in Milan.

Collaborations 
Since many years, Sartori has partnered with Benjamin Millepied, co-founder of the L.A. Dance Project. In 2015/2016 he designed costumes for Millepied's team at the Paris Opera Ballet. In 2017 all the dancers of the L.A. Dance Project performed in Marfa, Texas, wearing Ermenegildo Zegna Couture custom made looks for a streaming life worldwide premiere. In 2019, all dancers from the L.A. Dance Project performed the world premiere of Bach Studies (part 2) at Théâtre des Champs-Elysées in Paris, wearing Ermenegildo Zegna XXX custom designed looks by Sartori.

In 2018 Sartori made the suits worn by actress Tilda Swinton who played the role of Josef Klemperer in Luca Guadagnino’s movie Suspiria.

Since 2018 Sartori started designing the costumes for Genny Savastano, one of the main characters of the Italian series Gomorra, played by Salvatore Esposito.

Awards and honors
 2005 – Best International Designer of the Year, awarded by GQ Spain
 2015 – Best Designer of the Year, awarded by GQ Spain
 2019 – I’m Alumni Award, awarded by Istituto Marangoni   
 2022 – XII Edition Premio Nazionale per l’Innovazione, Premio dei Premi for #UseTheExisting

Celebrities
Many celebrities have worn outfits designed by Sartori.

In 2003, actor Adrien Brody wore Zegna to the Golden Globes and the Oscars. Brody also featured in Zegna campaigns that year.

Actors and celebrities who wore Zegna outfits designed by Sartori include: Mahershala Ali and Javier Bardem; Jake Gyllenhaal; Chadwick Boseman, Sterling K. Brown, Lakeith Stanfield and Chris Pine, Quincy Taylor Brown, Ben Hardy, Daniel Brühl, Mena Massoud, Riz Ahmed, Will Poulter and models Joan Smalls, Toni Garrn, Karrueche Tran.

Many other celebrities have worn Zegna outfits as part of a four-chapter campaign called Defining Moments, launched in 2017. The campaign featured Robert De Niro, McCaul Lombardi, Benjamin Millepied, Park Chan-Wook, Yoo Ji-Tae, Wang Deshun, Sunny Wang, Javier Bardem, Dev Patel.

In 2019 Zegna launched the “What does it mean to be a man today?” campaign, a first act featuring Mahershala Ali and Nicholas Tse, focused on the actual meaning of modern masculinity, followed by few more until Fall/Winter 2021. Among the other international talents involved in the campaign the model, singer and songwriter Gabriel-Kane Day-Lewis and his mother five time César Award-winning actress Isabelle Adjani.

In 2022 Zegna presented THE 232 brand value campaign, involving its family of visionaries including Italian musician Marracash, actor Isaac Hempstead Wright and movement director Yagamoto.

Leaders from business, sport, entertainment, design, and culture have even become part of Zegna extended family over the years, these include Riz Ahmed at the 94th Academy Award, John Legend, Colin Farrell, Alvaro Morte, Andrew Garfield, Li Xian, Pierfrancesco Favino, BTS and many more.

References

External links 
 

1966 births
Living people
Italian fashion designers